Admiral Charcoal's Song is the first album by Rebecca Moore. It was released in 1995. It is based on a surrealist musical written and directed by Moore in New York; after hearing it, Michael Dorf offered a record deal through his Knitting Factory Records label. The songs were revised and arranged before being recorded. Moore deems it a formative work, though it is popular among experimental music enthusiasts.

Critical reception
Trouser Press called the album "darkly whimsical and impressionist," writing that "Moore conducts a rarefied tour through a bizarre imagination." Billboard called it "a woefully overlooked album of dark drama and hypnotic beauty."

Track listing
All tracks written by Rebecca Moore.

 If You Please Me
 Busy Head
 Needle Men
 Twisty Lullag'bye
 Outdoor Elevator
 The Lamp Shop
 All The Halloweens You Can Hold
 Darkroom
 The Sisters Bernice
 Cripple Kingdom
 Rosalie's Nightmare

Personnel
Rebecca Moore: Vocals, Acoustic guitar, sound effects
Christina Campenella: backing vocals
Jeff Buckley: Electric 6 String Bass, Drums
Reuben Radding: Acoustic and electric bass
Larry Miller: Voice
Nina Piaseckyj: Cello
Steven Bernstein: Trumpet

References

1996 debut albums
Rebecca Moore (artist) albums